Gaedeodes is a genus of moths of the family Noctuidae. The genus was erected by David Stephen Fletcher and Pierre Viette in 1955.

Species
Gaedeodes collenettei Fletcher & Viette, 1955 Ivory Coast
Gaedeodes testacea Fletcher & Viette, 1955 Guinea

References

Herminiinae